Aplax is a dubious genus of extinct thalassochelydian turtle from the Late Jurassic of Germany. The type and only species is Aplax oberndorferi, named by Hermann von Meyer in 1843 for a complete juvenile skeleton from the early Tithonian of the Solnhofen Formation in Bavaria. Despite being aware that shell morphology changes during growth, Meyer named Aplax due to his consideration it represented a relative of Dermochelys, where the adults lack distinction of shell regions as in Aplax. However the taxon was later referred to Thalassochelydia by Anquetin and colleagues in 2017, and due to the loss of the original holotype it cannot be identified as a distinct taxon of a juvenile of existing Solnhofen turtles and is therefore a nomen dubium.

References

Thalassochelydia
Prehistoric turtle genera
Tithonian genera
Late Jurassic turtles
Late Jurassic reptiles of Europe
Jurassic Germany
Fossils of Germany
Nomina dubia
Fossil taxa described in 1843
Taxa named by Christian Erich Hermann von Meyer